ATP-binding cassette sub-family A member 7 is a protein that in humans is encoded by the ABCA7 gene.

Function 

The protein encoded by this gene is a member of the superfamily of ATP-binding cassette (ABC) transporters. ABC proteins transport various molecules across extra- and intra-cellular membranes. ABC genes are divided into seven distinct subfamilies: ABC1, MDR/TAP, CFTR/MRP, ALD (adrenoleukodystrophy), OABP, GCN20, and White. This protein is a member of the ABC1 subfamily. Members of the ABC1 subfamily comprise the only major ABC subfamily found exclusively in multicellular eukaryotes. This full transporter has been detected predominantly in myelo-lymphatic tissues with the highest expression in peripheral leukocytes, thymus, spleen, and bone marrow. The function of this protein is not yet known; however, the expression pattern suggests a role in lipid homeostasis in cells of the immune system. Alternative splicing of this gene results in two transcript variants.

Lack of ABCA7 gene exhibits phenotypes in mice, such as moderate decrease in plasma HDL and adipose tissues only in female, while release of cellular cholesterol and phospholipid is not impaired.
Accordingly, decrease in plasma lectin level was also reported.
Reduction of CD3 or CD1d may lead to dysfunction of T cells by deletion of ABCA7.

On the other hand, transfected and expressed ABCA7, but not endogenous ABCA7, mediates release of cell phospholipid and cholesterol to generate HDL-like particles but contain less cholesterol than those generated by ABCA1. 

ABCA7-generated HDL is smaller and appears as a single peak in a molecular sieve HPLC analysis in comparison to HDL generated by ABCA1 that shows twin peaks of small and poor in cholesterol and large and rich in cholesterol. 

ABCA7 mRNA generates full length cDNA and a spliced form of cDNA, and only the former is capable of generating HDL when transfected.

ABCA7 was shown associated with cellular phagocytotic activity. The promoter of ABCA7 contains sterol regulatory element (SRE) so that ABCA7 is down-regulated by cell cholesterol through sterol regulatory element binding protein (SREBP) 2. Therefore, ABCA7 expression and phagocytosis are up-regulated by use of HMG-reductase inhibitors (statins). In addition, ABCA7 is stabilized like ABCA1 by helical apolipoproteins such as apoA-I, and phagocytosis is accordingly increased in such a condition.

In summary, ABCA7 is a substantially related protein to ABCA1 but it does not mediate cell cholesterol release by generation of HDL unless it is externally transfected and expressed in vitro. ABCA7 is shown associated with cellular phagocytotic function in vivo and in vitro, and expression of the ABCA7 gene is regulated by cell cholesterol mainly through the SRE/SREBP system in a negative feed-back fashion in contrast to positive feedback by the LXR/RXR system for ABCA1. ABCA7 thus links cholesterol metabolism to host defense system.

Clinical significance 

In 2011, two genome-wide association studies (GWAS) identified ABCA7 as a new susceptibility locus for late-onset Alzheimer's disease. The finding was also confirmed by other meta-analysis investigations later. Such association of ABCA7 variants was reported on more specific findings of the disease such as memory decline and incident mild cognitive impairment  or cortical and hippocampal atrophy.

Protein-disrupting variants in ABCA7 have been shown to predispose to Alzheimer's disease. The Icelandic database of Decode Genetics has shown a doubled probability of developing Alzheimer's disease when inactive variants of the ABCA7 gene are present.

By using the knock-out mice, ABCA7 was indicated involved in generation and processing of amyloid β (Aβ) peptides. In the brain of the amyloid precursor protein transgenic mice, deletion of ABCA7 resulted in accumulation of Aβ40 and Aβ42 in the early stage  apparently by accelerating Aβ production. More rapid endocytosis of amyloid precursor protein was observed in primary microglia from ABCA7 deficient mice. Roles of ABCA7 are also implicated for microglial phagocytotic function  and immune responses. Although the direct target of ABCA7 function is unclear, the findings are so far mechanistically consistent with the increased Aβ production.

The data can be summarized as 1) loss of function of ABCA7 is associated with a risk for late onset Alzheimer's disease, 2) one of its molecular backgrounds can be enhanced production/decreased processing of Aβ peptides, and 3) ABCA7 is at least shown to increase phagocytosis including that of microglia. Since ABCA7 gene is down-regulated by cell cholesterol via the SRE/SREBP system, the data accumulated are consistent with clinical implication that use of statins, HMG-CoA reductase inhibitors, reduces risk for Alzheimer's disease.

See also 
 ATP-binding cassette transporter

Notes

References

Further reading

External links 
 
  
 

ATP-binding cassette transporters